Perpetual Flame is the sixteenth studio album by guitarist Yngwie Malmsteen and his group Rising Force, released on 13 October 2008 in Europe and on 14 October 2008 in the US and Canada. It was his first album since 2005's Unleash the Fury and the first with ex-Judas Priest and Iced Earth singer Tim "Ripper" Owens. The album also features famed keyboardist Derek Sherinian on keyboards.

The album was produced by Malmsteen himself, who also served as engineer, and was mixed by Roy Z (of Bruce Dickinson and Halford fame) and mastered by Maor Appelbaum (of Halford, Lita Ford, Therion fame).

The tracks "Red Devil", "Damnation Game", and "Caprici di Diablo" were made as downloadable content for the games Rock Band and Rock Band 2 on 25 November 2008.

For unknown reasons, the song titled "Four Horsemen (Of the Apocalypse)" was not included in the Japanese release.

On tour, Malmsteen was joined by Bjorn Englen on bass and Michael Troy on keyboards.

"Tide of Desire" and "Eleventh Hour"
Lyrics were printed in the insert of Perpetual Flame for a song entitled "Tide of Desire." The lyrics are about not giving up, and of a perpetual fire, a flame still burning; themes that seem to go with the title of the album. When asked in a recent interview, Yngwie stated that "Tide of Desire" was accidentally printed and will be omitted in future releases. "Tide Of Desire" was eventually released on Yngwie's 2010 album Relentless.

The eleventh song on the album is spelled in three different ways. On the back of the album, the song is called "Leventh Hour", while on the back of the booklet the song's title is "Eleventh Hour". Finally, inside the booklet the song is called "The Eleventh Hour". On iTunes, however, "Eleventh Hour" is still spelled "Leventh Hour".

The three instrumentals are also handled in a peculiar way. The song "Lament" is mentioned inside the booklet as being an instrumental with the music written by Yngwie J. Malmsteen, but there is no mention at all of the other two, "Caprici Di Diablo" and "Heavy Heart".

All of these problems seem to be fixed in later copies of the album.

Critical reception

The album has achieved generally positive reviews from critics. Critic Greg Prato of Allmusic writes "Not since the days of Jeff Scott Soto has Yngwie Malmsteen shared the spotlight with a singer who possessed enough pizazz to truly stand toe to toe with the Swedish six-string shredder...the result is Yngwie's best album in some time."

Track listing

Personnel
 Yngwie Malmsteen - lead & rhythm guitars, bass, additional keyboards, backing vocals and lead vocals on "Magic City".
 Tim "Ripper" Owens - lead vocals
 Derek Sherinian - keyboards
 Patrick Johansson - drums
 Roy Z – mixing
 Maor Appelbaum- mastering

References

Neoclassical albums
2008 albums
Yngwie Malmsteen albums